The Plum Blossoms is a 1948 painting by Henri Matisse.

Museum of Modern Art
On September 8, 2005, it was purchased for New York's Museum of Modern Art by Henry Kravis and the new president of the museum, Marie-Josée Drouin.

Private collection
Previously, it had not been seen by the public since 1970.

Late-period Matisse
The Plum Blossoms is an example of one of the final group of oil paintings in Matisse's career.

External links
 New York Times article on purchase

1948 paintings
Paintings by Henri Matisse
Paintings in the collection of the Museum of Modern Art (New York City)